Undefeated Bahamut Chronicle is an anime series adapted from the light novel series of the same title, written by Senri Akatsuki and illustrated by Ayumu Kasuga. Masaomi Andō directed the series at Lerche. Yuuko Kakihara handled the series composition, while Keiko Kurosawa designed the characters. The series aired from January 11 to March 28, 2016. It was streamed on Hulu.

The anime has been licensed by Sentai Filmworks, Madman Entertainment and MVM Films in the United States, Australia and the United Kingdom, respectively.


Episode list

Notes

References

Undefeated Bahamut Chronicle